William Bagot, 3rd Baron Bagot DL (27 March 1811 – 19 January 1887), styled The Honourable from birth until 1856, was a British courtier and Conservative politician.

Background
Born at Blithfield House, he was the eldest son of William Bagot, 2nd Baron Bagot and his second wife Lady Louisa, daughter of George Legge, 3rd Earl of Dartmouth. Bagot was educated at Charterhouse School, then at Eton College and finally at Magdalene College, Cambridge.

Career
He was returned to Parliament for Denbighshire in 1835, a seat he held until 1852. The year before, he had been nominated lieutenant-colonel of the Staffordshire Yeomanry Cavalry, which he commanded from 1854. He represented the county as deputy lieutenant and in 1856, Bagot succeeded his father as baron, entering subsequently the House of Lords. He served in the Conservative administrations of the Earl of Derby and Benjamin Disraeli as a Lord-in-waiting (government whip in the House of Lords) from 1866 to 1868 and again from 1874 to 1880. Apart from his political career he was Gentleman of the Bedchamber to the Prince Consort between 1858 and the next year.

Family
Lord Bagot married the Hon. Lucia Caroline Elizabeth, daughter of George Agar-Ellis, 1st Baron Dover, in 1851. They had two sons and five daughters. Their daughter Louisa married Hamar Alfred Bass of the Bass Brewery family in 1879. Bagot died in January 1887, aged 75, and was succeeded in the barony by his eldest son William. Lady Bagot survived her husband by eight years and died in January 1895, aged 68.

Notes

References 
Kidd, Charles, Williamson, David (editors). Debrett's Peerage and Baronetage (1990 edition). New York: St Martin's Press, 1990,

External links
 

1811 births
1887 deaths
Conservative Party (UK) MPs for Welsh constituencies
Deputy Lieutenants of Staffordshire
People educated at Charterhouse School
People educated at Eton College
UK MPs 1835–1837
UK MPs 1837–1841
UK MPs 1841–1847
UK MPs 1847–1852
UK MPs who inherited peerages
Alumni of Magdalene College, Cambridge
Staffordshire Yeomanry officers
William 3